The EAR 27 class, previously known as the EAR MR class, was a sub-class of  gauge  USATC S118 Class steam locomotives operated by the East African Railways (EAR), and, with one exception, previously by the Malayan Railways.

Service history
The first eight members of the class were built in 1944, and were acquired second hand by the Tanganyika Railway (TR) from the Malayan Railways in 1949.  Those locomotives entered service on the Central Line in Tanganyika in 1949. By that time, the TR had been succeeded by the EAR, which designated them for a very short time as its MR class, but then, as part of a comprehensive reclassification of all of its locomotives, redesignated and renumbered them as its 27 class.

In 1950, the EAR acquired eight further 27 class locomotives from the Malayan Railways, and in 1953 another 27 class locomotive was built in the EAR's Dar es Salaam Workshops, using spare parts acquired from the Nigerian Railways.  The 27 class therefore eventually reached a total of 17 locomotives.

Class list
The builders, build year and fleet numbers of each member of the class were as follows:

See also
History of rail transport in Tanzania

References

Notes

Bibliography

External links

ALCO locomotives
Baldwin locomotives
Davenport locomotives
East African Railways locomotives
Metre gauge steam locomotives
Railway locomotives introduced in 1944
Scrapped locomotives
Steam locomotives of Tanzania
MR class
USATC S118 Class
2-8-2 locomotives
Freight locomotives